Irene González López (born 23 July 1996) is a Spanish water polo player who won the silver medal with the women's national water polo team at the 2020 Summer Olympics celebrated in Tokyo, Japan.

Early career

González graduate of IES CAR Sant Cugat, Barcelona, in 2014. She helped her national team to win the silver medal at 2013 and 2015 FINA Junior World Championships.

College career

González attended University of Hawaii at Manoa, playing on the women's water polo team from 2016 to 2019. As a freshman, she led the team with 73 goals, scoring in 24 matches with 18 multiple-goal games. She was named 2016 Big West Freshman of the Year.

She led the team to the Big West Conference championship in 2019 and to second place in 2018. She was named 2018 and 2019 Big West Player of the Year, being first player in University of Hawaii history to earn Big West Player of the Year multiple times and First-Team All-Big West for the fourth-straight season.

González was also named 2018 and 2019 All-America First Team by the Association of Collegiate Water Polo Coaches (ACWPC).
 
González graduated from Hawaii University in May 2019 with a B.S. degree in Kinesiology & Rehab Science.

Club career

After playing several years for CN Sant Feliú and CN Rubí, in May 2019, González signed contract with Spanish professional club CN Mataró. In September 2020 she joined CN Sabadell.

International career

González made her senior debut in 2016 winning the silver medal at the 2016 FINA World League - Super Final. In 2019 she won the silver medal at the World Championships celebrated in Gwangju, South Korea.

See also
 List of Olympic medalists in water polo
 List of World Aquatics Championships medalists in water polo

References

External links
 

Spanish female water polo players
Living people
1996 births
Water polo players from Barcelona
Water polo players at the 2020 Summer Olympics
Medalists at the 2020 Summer Olympics
Olympic silver medalists for Spain in water polo
21st-century Spanish women
Sportswomen from Catalonia